Electric Eel is a steel launched coaster at SeaWorld San Diego in San Diego, California. The coaster opened in 2018 and became the park's tallest and fastest roller coaster until the opening of Emperor in 2022, and is themed around the Electric eel. An educational centre and exhibit can also be found by the attraction.

History
On January 3, 2017, SeaWorld San Diego announced their intention to add the Electric Eel roller coaster in time for the summer 2018 season. The coaster would be a launched coaster from Maryland-based Premier Rides, and alongside three new attractions opening later that year would mark a 24-month period of the park's largest growth since their opening in 1964. Electric Eel was proposed in January 2017 to be located on the park's eastern side, near the existing Journey to Atlantis water coaster, and given its notable height, would be painted lighter colors from the 60-foot mark and higher in order to comply with transparency requirements.

Work began later that year, and crews installed more than 200  diameter columns up to 40 feet below ground in order to support the ride's 11,000-square-foot foundation mat, which was completed by November 2017. Vertical construction began shortly after, and wrapped up on January 17, 2018. During a media tour on the said date to commemorate the topping off, the ride's car was first unveiled. On March 29, 2018, amid the ride's test runs, SeaWorld officials set Electric Eel's opening date for May 12, 2018. However, on April 17, the date was moved up to two days earlier than originally planned, on May 10, whereas park representatives cited the project to be well ahead of schedule. As planned, Electric Eel officially opened to the public on May 10, 2018.

Ride experience

Queue
The Queue area meanders around an ocean floor landscape located in front of Electric Eel, near the Ocean Explorer park area. The usage of handrails and permanent shade structures is minimal, and educational signage spread throughout the queue offer facts about the Electric eel. The queue also features an original musical score by composer Rick McKee.

Layout
Riders are launched forwards out of the station and up into a partial twist. The train then falls back through the station, where it is accelerated backwards into another twist. Upon exiting the roll, riders twist down into a full a full non-inverting loop before coming to an eventual stop in the station. One full cycle of the ride experience lasts approximately 50 seconds. The coaster also features a high-energy soundtrack by Rick McKee (matching the movements of the coaster) for riders on the boarding platform.

Characteristics

Statistics
The ride operates with a single 3 car train, with each car holding 6 riders in 3 rows of 2 for a total of 18 riders per train. Combined with steady operations, the advertised capacity is 720 riders per hour. The attraction sits on 1.2 acres of land, and the station occupies an area of 1,130 square feet.

Model
Electric Eel is a Sky Rocket II model coaster from Premier Rides. The compact launched coaster model is one of three bought by the SeaWorld Parks & Entertainment group, and the second one to be installed. The other two are Tempesto (2015) at Busch Gardens Williamsburg in James City County, Virginia, and Tigris (2019) at Busch Gardens Tampa Bay in Tampa, Florida. The attraction has also been cloned elsewhere, with the original being Superman: Ultimate Flight (2012) at Six Flags Discovery Kingdom in Vallejo, California, although unlike many of the other units installed the SeaWorld coasters operate with a longer train, increasing capacity by 50%.

Contractors
A large number of firms were involved in the design and construction process of Electric Eel, with credits being handed out to the following:

Ride Manufacturer: Premier Rides
General Contractor: Rudolph and Sletten Inc.
Subcontractor: Cemrock Landscapes Inc.
Lead Design Firm/Architect: PGAV Destinations
Structural Engineer: EDM Inc.
Geotechnical Engineer: Hayward Baker
MEP Engineer: EXP Inc.
Engineering Consultants; Christian Wheeler Engineering
Rick McKee: Original Musical Score

References

External links

Roller coasters in California
2018 establishments in California
Roller coasters introduced in 2018
Roller coasters operated by SeaWorld Parks & Entertainment